Transperience was a short-lived museum of passenger transport located at Low Moor, in the south of Bradford in West Yorkshire, Northern England. It opened in July 1995, but closed only 2 years later in October 1997, with debts of over £1 million.

Museum

The museum was built on the site of Low Moor railway station, (which had closed in 1965), at a cost of £11.5 million. It included a  tram line which made use of the trackbed of the Spen Valley Line towards Cleckheaton, and visitors could ride on a Hungarian tram or a trolleybus. There was also a series of vehicle simulators and an auditorium.

The museum failed to attract the numbers of visitors hoped and was closed in 1997.

The site today

The museum site was sold to a property developer in 1998 and is now an industrial estate. Some parts of the museum, such as the auditorium, still stand. A number of the vehicles in its collection have been sold to other collections, such as the Keighley Bus Museum or the Dewsbury Bus Museum.

Reopened station

The land formerly occupied by the museum is the site of the new Low Moor railway station.

References

Further reading

External links
 Lost Railways West Yorkshire - includes some photographs of the park whilst open and promotional literature

Buildings and structures in Bradford
Museums in Bradford
Museums established in 1995
Defunct museums in England
Transport museums in England